4946 Askalaphus is a Jupiter trojan from the Greek camp, approximately  in diameter. It was discovered on 21 January 1988 by American astronomer couple Carolyn and Eugene Shoemaker at the Palomar Observatory in California. The dark D-type asteroid belongs to the 100 largest Jupiter trojans and has a rotation period of 22.7 hours. It was named after Ascalaphus from Greek mythology.

Orbit and classification 

Askalaphus is a dark Jovian asteroid in a 1:1 orbital resonance with Jupiter. It is located in the leading Greek camp at the gas giant's  Lagrangian point, 60° ahead on its orbit . It is also a non-family asteroid of the Jovian background population. It orbits the Sun at a distance of 5.0–5.6 AU once every 12 years and 3 months (4,479 days; semi-major axis of 5.32 AU). Its orbit has an eccentricity of 0.05 and an inclination of 22° with respect to the ecliptic. The body's observation arc begins with a precovery taken at Palomar in December 1950, more than 37 years prior to its official discovery observation.

Naming 

This minor planet was named from Greek mythology after Ascalaphus (Askalaphus), son of Ares and Astyoche, and twin brother of Ialmenos. The two brothers belonged to the Argonauts. Leader of the Orchomenian contingent in the Trojan War, he was killed in battle by Deiphobus's spear. The official  was published by the Minor Planet Center on 12 July 1995.

Physical characteristics 

In the SDSS-based taxonomy, Askalaphus is a D-type asteroid. It has also been characterized as a D-type by Pan-STARRS' survey. Its V–I color index of 0.94, is typical for most larger Jupiter trojans (see table below).

Rotation period 

In May 1992, a rotational lightcurve of Askalaphus was obtained from photometric observations by Italian astronomer Stefano Mottola using the ESO 1-metre telescope at La Silla Observatory in northern Chile. Lightcurve analysis gave a rotation period of  hours with a brightness amplitude of 0.40 magnitude. With a period close to that of the Earth, a complete observational coverage of the lightcurve was challenging and had to be carefully planned.

Diameter and albedo 

According to the surveys carried out by the NEOWISE mission of NASA's Wide-field Infrared Survey Explorer, The Infrared Astronomical Satellite IRAS, and the Japanese Akari satellite, Askalaphus measures between 48.21 and 66.10 kilometers in diameter and its surface has an albedo between 0.046 and 0.069. The Collaborative Asteroid Lightcurve Link assumes a standard albedo for a carbonaceous asteroid of 0.057 and calculates a diameter of 50.77 kilometers based on an absolute magnitude of 10.2.

References

External links 
 Asteroid Lightcurve Database (LCDB), query form (info )
 Dictionary of Minor Planet Names, Google books
 Discovery Circumstances: Numbered Minor Planets (1)-(5000) – Minor Planet Center
 
 

004946
Discoveries by Carolyn S. Shoemaker
Discoveries by Eugene Merle Shoemaker
Named minor planets
19880121